Basil Tenywa Tuma (born 24 April 2005) is a Maltese-Ugandan professional footballer who plays as a winger for  club Reading. Despite being born in Uganda, his family moved to Berkshire at a young age.

Football career

Club

Reading
Tuma made his debut for Reading in their 2-1 EFL Cup defeat to Stevenage on 9 August 2022, playing 55 minutes before being replaced by Jahmari Clarke.

International
Tuma represented Uganda at the 2020 CECAFA U-17 Championship, where they were victorious over Tanzania in the final.
Tuma was then called up for the Malta U19 in September 2022.

Athletics
Tuma was educated at Eton College and finished 3rd in the Junior Boys 100 metres at the 2019 ESAA English Schools Track & Field Championships, with a time of 11.23seconds.

Career statistics

Honours 
Uganda under-17
 CECAFA U-17 Championship: 2020

References

External links
 

2005 births
Living people
English footballers
Ugandan footballers
Reading F.C. players
Association football midfielders
People educated at Eton College